Pacific Islands Monthly, commonly referred to as "PIM", was a magazine founded in 1930 in Sydney by New Zealand born journalist R.W. Robson.

Background
Pacific Islands Monthly was started in Sydney in 1930. The first issue ran in August 1930. It consisted of 12 pages and was in the format of a newspaper. The following year it was presented in magazine format. Its founder Robert William Robson, who was originally from New Zealand, moved to Sydney, Australia during World War I. The journalists for the magazine were said to be some of the Pacific's most respected.

During the 1940s the magazine included advertisements for W. R. Carpenter & Co.

The magazine ran for approximately 70 years with the first issue on 16 August 1930 and the last issue on 1 June 2000.

Pacific Islands Monthly (1931-2000) has been digitised, and is now freely available online through Trove.

References

External links 

 Digitised issues at Trove

Defunct magazines published in Australia
Monthly magazines published in Australia
Magazines published in Sydney
1930 establishments in Australia
2000 disestablishments in Australia
Defunct magazines published in New Zealand
English-language magazines
Magazines established in 1930
Magazines disestablished in 2000
Mass media in Oceania